Yevhen Solunskiy (born 13 June 1959) is a Soviet speed skater. He competed in the men's 1500 metres event at the 1980 Winter Olympics.

References

1959 births
Living people
Soviet male speed skaters
Olympic speed skaters of the Soviet Union
Speed skaters at the 1980 Winter Olympics
Place of birth missing (living people)